Neomitranthes langsdorfii is a species of plant in the family Myrtaceae. It is endemic to Brazil.

References

Endemic flora of Brazil
langsdorfii
Vulnerable plants
Taxonomy articles created by Polbot
Taxobox binomials not recognized by IUCN